Ravašnica is a mountain in the municipality of Kupres, Canton 10 of the Federation of Bosnia and Herzegovina,  Bosnia and Herzegovina.

See also
List of mountains in Bosnia and Herzegovina

References

Mountains of Bosnia and Herzegovina